Shaun Daniel McWilliams (born 14 August 1998) is an English footballer who plays as a midfielder for Northampton Town.

Career
Having come through the youth academy at Northampton Town, McWilliams had his first taste of senior football when, in August 2016, he joined Southern League Premier Division side King's Lynn Town on a youth-loan deal.

McWilliams made his debut for Northampton Town on 1 April 2017 in a 1–1 draw away at Rochdale. He came off of the bench aged just 18 in the 61' minute of the match, replacing John-Joe O'Toole. Following five first-team appearances at the end of the 2016–17 season, McWilliams signed a new three-year contract with the club on 29 September 2017 after impressing manager Jimmy Floyd Hasselbaink. McWilliams would feature 19 times in the league during the 2017–18 season as Northampton were relegated to League Two after two seasons back in the third tier, McWilliams featuring on the final day of the season as a 2–2 draw with Oldham Athletic, a result that saw relegation confirmed for both sides.

On 21 September 2019, he scored his first professional goal in a 2–2 draw with Crawley Town. In November 2019 he underwent surgery on his appendix. On Boxing Day 2019, McWilliams was stretchered off in a 4–0 defeat to Crawley Town, an injury that would keep him out for the rest of the season which ended in success for the Cobblers as they secured promotion back to the third tier with a 4–0 play-off final victory over Exeter City.

Personal life
McWilliams' brother Camron is also a footballer who came through the youth system at Northampton too before moving to Cardiff City.

Career statistics

References

External links

Shaun McWilliams at Aylesbury United

1998 births
Living people
Footballers from Northampton
English footballers
Association football midfielders
Association football fullbacks
Northampton Town F.C. players
King's Lynn Town F.C. players
Southern Football League players
English Football League players